Ohel (plural: , literally, "tent") is a structure built around a Jewish grave as a sign of prominence of the deceased.  cover the graves of some (but not all) Hasidic Rebbes, important rabbis, tzadikim, prominent Jewish community leaders, and biblical figures. Typically a small masonry building, an  may include room for visitors to pray, meditate, and light candles in honor of the deceased.

Source
According to Krajewska, the tradition of covering a grave with an  may be based on the Cave of the Patriarchs, in which Abraham buried Sarah.

Construction
 are usually simple masonry structures. They may include one or two windows.

The  of the Lubavitcher Rebbes in Queens, New York, is unusual in that it does not have a roof. This allows  to visit the graves without coming into contact with impurity from the dead.

Use
In the case of a Hasidic Rebbe, the ohel is a place for visitors to pray, meditate, write kvitelach (petitionary prayer notes), and light candles in honor of the deceased. Ohelim of Hasidic Rebbes, as well as the tombs of tzadikim venerated by Moroccan Jews, serve as year-round pilgrimage sites, with the biggest influx of visitors coming on the Rebbe's or tzadik's Yom Hillula (anniversary of death).

Notable ohelim
One or more graves may be included in the same ohel. Notable ohelim include:

Single-grave ohel
 Baba Sali, Netivot, Israel
 Chida, Har HaMenuchot, Jerusalem
 Yonatan ben Uziel, Amuka, Israel
 Elimelech of Lizhensk, Leżajsk, Poland
 Chaim Ozer Grodzinski, leader of pre-war Eastern European Jewry
 Nachman of Breslov, Uman, Ukraine
 Nathan of Breslov, Breslov, Ukraine
 Rachel, wife of Rabbi Akiva, Tiberias, Israel
 Vilna Gaon, Vilnius, Lithuania

Multiple-grave ohel
 Avraham Mordechai Alter and Pinchas Menachem Alter, the third and sixth rebbes of Ger, Jerusalem
 Baal Shem Tov, Ze'ev Wolf Kitzes, the Degel Machaneh Ephraim, the Apter Rav, and Rabbi Boruch of Medzhybizh, Medzhybizh, Ukraine
 Avrohom Bornsztain and his son Rabbi Shmuel Bornsztain, Sochatchover Rebbes
 Dov Ber of Mezeritch and Zusha of Anipoli
 Shlomo Halberstam and Naftali Halberstam, the third and fourth Bobover Rebbes, New York
 Yosef Yitzchok Schneersohn and Rabbi Menachem Mendel Schneerson, the sixth and seventh Lubavitcher Rebbes, Queens, New York
 Joel Teitelbaum and Moses Teitelbaum, first and second Satmar Rebbes

Biblical figures and Talmudic sages 
Biblical figures and Mishnaic and  Talmudic sages are typically buried in ohelim:
  Benjamin (near Kfar Saba, Israel)
  Esther and Mordechai, Hamadan, Iran
  Habakkuk, northern Israel
  Judah, Yehud, Israel
  Rabbi Meir or Rabbi Meir Baal HaNes (Rabbi Meir the miracle maker) was a Jewish sage who lived in the time of the Mishna.
  Rachel, near Bethlehem
  Simeon bar Yochai, Meron, Israel is the site of a large annual Lag BaOmer celebration
  Yose HaGelili, Dalton, Israel

Gallery

See also
 List of burial places of biblical figures

References

Sources

External links
 Chabad.org: The Ohel

Jewish practices
Jewish cemeteries
Jewish holy places
Jewish mausoleums
Jewish pilgrimage sites
Jewish buildings